ABP Sanjha is the Punjabi language news channel, launched in 2014, by Media Content and Communication Services (MCCS), a news broadcasting company, owned by the ABP Group.

See also
 ABP Group
 ABP News
 International broadcasting
 List of Indian television stations
 24-hour television news channels

References

External links
 

24-hour television news channels in India
Punjabi-language television channels in India
Television channels and stations established in 2014
ABP Group
2014 establishments in Chandigarh